Andrew Shore (born 19 March 1990) is an Irish hurler who plays as a centre-back for the Wexford senior teams.

Born in Davidstown, County Wexford, Shore first arrived on the inter-county scene at the age of seventeen when he first linked up with the Wexford minor team, before later joining the under-21 side. He made his senior debut during the 2009 National Hurling League. Since then Shore has been a regular member of the starting fifteen, and has won one National League (Division 2) medal.

As a member of the Leinster inter-provincial team on a number of occasions, Shore has won one Railway Cup medal. At club level he plays with Davidstown-Courtnacuddy.

Honours
Davidstown-Courtnacuddy
Wexford Junior Hurling Championship (2): 2007, 2015

Parnells
Dublin Senior B Hurling Championship (1): 2013

Wexford
National Hurling League (Division 2) (1): 2010

Leinster
Railway Cup (1): 2014

References

1990 births
Living people
Wexford inter-county hurlers
Leinster inter-provincial hurlers
Davidstown-Courtnacuddy hurlers